Langenzenn is a town in the district of Fürth, in Bavaria, Germany. It is situated 15 km west of Fürth.
The town lies on the river Zenn and has a population of 10.339 people (31. December 2012).

Geography 
It belongs to the district of Fürth near Nürnberg and lies in the Rangau.

Neighbouring Towns:
Wilhermsdorf (6,3 km)
Großhabersdorf
Cadolzburg (7,36 km)
Veitsbronn (6,29 km)
Puschendorf (4,41 km)
Emskirchen (8,19 km)
Hagenbüchach (4,41 km)

History 
First possible historic mention in 903 by king Ludwig IV as "Zenna". It is not proven, that "Zenna" means Langenzenn here or the abandoned village "Zennhausen" near Neuhof an der Zenn.

The first evident mention is in 954 when King Otto I. held an important meeting with the German nobles in Langenzenn to reunite them.

Langenzenn got the rights and privileges of a town in 1360.
Around that time the Halsgericht moved from Cadolzburg to Langenzenn. Thus, the town got the full jurisdiction.
The last execution was carried out in 1763.
1361 it got the right to produce money by king Karl IV.

A big fire in 1720 destroyed the town hall. A new town hall was built, which is still extant.

Development of population

Culture 

Langenzenn has a theater where the Klosterhofspiele Langenzenn are performed every summer. Another ensemble with more tradition is the Hans-Sachs-Spielgruppe. Both act in the courtyard of the medieval monastery, which was built in 1409.
The gothic evangelian church exists since 1369.
Langenzenn still has remains of the city wall.
In 2005 and 2006 the Prinzregentenplatz, the medieval market place of the town was remodeled.

Klosterhofspiele
Since a lot of years the Klosterhofspiele are a part of Langenzenn culture. The chairman is Roland Schönfelder.
They staged for example Le Bourgeois gentilhomme (2001) and Le Malade imaginaire (1990) by Molière, Twelfth Night (1989), The Merry Wives of Windsor (2004), and The Taming of the Shrew (2002) by Shakespeare, and Lysistrata (2003) by Aristophanes.

Hans-Sachs-Spielgruppe
The ensemble was founded in 1963. The chairman is Klaus Roscher.

Economy and infrastructure 

Langenzenn lies on the Südwesttangente, so it is connected very well to Fürth/Nürnberg.
The railway Zenngrundbahn was built in 1872. It consorts from Fürth to Markt Erlbach and back every hour. Langenzenn has 3 stations: Langenzenn main railway station, Hardhof and Laubendorf.

Public Institutions 

Since 1977 Langenzenn has an indoor pool.
The local museum opened in 1957. 
In 1382 a hospital was built. The oldest part existing today is from 1536. In 2007 the hospital was closed.

The youth center Alte Post was founded in 1977 and is the oldest youth center in the area.
The public library was founded in 1903,restored in 1983 and has ca. 22000 books.

Education 
Langenzenn has a school system since 1439.
Since 1967 it has an elementary and a Mittelschule  which is similar to the secondary modern school.
1984 the Wolfang Borchert Gymnasium was founded in Langenzenn, which has room for 1150 school children.
There is also a Realschule.
Langenzenn has also 4 kindergartens.

Residing companies 
Bricks have been produced in Langenzenn since the 16th century. After World War II only 2 companies still produce bricks: The Koramic Dachprodukte GmbH & Co. KG,belonging to the Wienerberger Gruppe ,and the Walther Dachziegel GmbH.

The steel- and materialtrader Heine + Beisswenger has business premises between Langenzenn and Burggrafenhof.

The packingproducer ElringKlinger AG exports his make to many automobile companies.

The  ELIA Tuning und Design AG is a Renault, Nissan and Dacia tuning company.

Langenzenn has several industrial areas, with many smaller companies being located there.

Media 
The Langenzenner Zeitung is published every month.

Sport 
Langenzenn's main sports club is the TSV 1894 Langenzenn supporting several sports, but mainly soccer.

Personalities

Sons and daughters of the city 

 Marie Dollinger (1910-1995), athlete
 Brunhilde Hendrix (1938-1995), athlete

Other personalities associated with the city 

 Sebastian Preiss (born 1981), grew up in Langenzenn, handball player

References

External links 

 Official Website
 TSV Langenzenn

 
Fürth (district)